The fencing competitions at the 2013 Mediterranean Games in Mersin took place between 21 June and 22 June at the CNR Mersin Yenişehir Exhibitio Centre Hall A.

Athletes competed in 6 events. There were no team events.

Medal summary

Men's events

Women's events

Medal table
Key:

References

Sports at the 2013 Mediterranean Games
2013
2013 in fencing
International fencing competitions hosted by Turkey